Gagik Gurgeni Khachatryan (born November 26, 1955) is an Armenian politician who held various positions in Armenia's state bureaucracy, notably serving as chairman of the State Revenue Committee from 2008 to 2014 and minister of finance from 2014 to 2016. He was popularly known as the "super minister" due to his numerous responsibilities. He is currently the defendant in a corruption-related criminal case in Armenia.

Early life and education 
Gagik Khachatryan was born in the village of Amasia in the Armenian SSR in 1955. He graduated from Yerevan Polytechnic University in 1977, majoring in industrial electronics. In 1987, he graduated from the Yerevan Institute of National Economy, receiving a degree in accounting and analysis of economic activity.

Professional experience 

 1977–1978 worked as an electronics engineer in “Electron” factory
 1978–1984 served as the second secretary of the initial organization of the Lenin Communist Youth Union Nairi regional committee
 1984–1986 worked as the head of the department of the State Agro-technical school after G. Aghajanyan
 1986–1989 served as the secretary of the initial party organization of Nor-Geghi State Technical College
 1989–1996 – First Deputy Director of "Nairi" agro-firm
 1996 worked as the Deputy Head of Hrazdan Tax Inspectorate
 1996–1999 – Head of Mashtots Region Tax Inspectorate
 1999–2000 – Head of the Tax Inspectorate of Erebuni region
 2000 – Head of the Tax Inspectorate of Shahumyan region
 2000–2001 – Deputy Head of the Tax Department of the RA Ministry of State Revenues
 2001–2008 – Deputy Chairman of the RA State Customs Committee
 April 15 – June 4, 2008 – Acting Chairman of the RA State Customs Committee
 On June 4, 2008, by the decision of the Prime Minister of Armenia, he was relieved of the post of Deputy Chairman of the State Customs Committee under the Government of Armenia
 On June 4, 2008, by the decree of the President of Armenia he was appointed as the Chairman of the State Customs Committee of Armenia
 On August 20, 2008, by the decree of the President of Armenia he was appointed as the Chairman of the State Revenue Committee of Armenia
 On April 26, 2014, he was relieved of the post of Chairman of the State Revenue Committee under the Government of Armenia by the decree of the President of Armenia
 On April 26, 2014, by the Decree of the President of Armenia he was appointed Minister of Finance of Armenia.

Personal life 
Gagik Khachatryan is married and has two sons and one daughter. His sons, Gurgen and Artyom Khachatryan, are entrepreneurs and the co-founders of Galaxy Group of Companies. As evidenced by the interview given to banks.am, Khachatryan’s two sons have never had involvement in politics or state work, and have strictly engaged in business. In 2019, they announced the “Innovation and Technology Park” project in Yerevan, with an estimated number of 6,000 jobs.

Legal issues 
Khachatryan is currently the accused in major corruption-related case in Armenia. The accusing side claims that he caused $41 million worth of damages to the Armenian state. His two sons (who are currently wanted in Armenia) and two of his nephews are also accused in corruption-related cases. In May 2022, the US government announced that it plans to seize a mansion in Los Angeles belonging to Khachatryan, contending that it was bought using bribe money. The case is under investigation by the FBI. A trust representing Khachatryan and his sons bought the mansion for $14.4 million in 2011, and the estate is currently on sale for $63.5 million.

Titles and awards 
On December 29, 2011, Gagik Khachatryan was awarded the special rank of Lieutenant General of the Customs Service by the decree of the president of Armenia. He received the Medal of Anania Shirakatsi in 2012.

References 

1955 births
Living people
National Polytechnic University of Armenia alumni
Armenian State University of Economics alumni
Electronics engineers
People from Shirak Province
Finance ministers of Armenia